Wielopole may refer to:
Polish name for Vělopolí in the Czech Republic
Wielopole, Łódź Voivodeship (central Poland)
Wielopole, Dąbrowa County in Lesser Poland Voivodeship (south Poland)
Wielopole, Nowy Sącz County in Lesser Poland Voivodeship (south Poland)
Wielopole, Greater Poland Voivodeship (west-central Poland)
Wielopole, West Pomeranian Voivodeship (north-west Poland)
Wielopole, Tarnobrzeg
Wielopole, Rybnik in Silesian Voivodeship (south Poland)